Oleg Anatolyevich Nikulin (born 8 February 1970; died 17 January 2006 in Novosibirsk) was a Russian football player.

He was a best scorer in history of FC Sibir Novosibirsk before being overtaken by Dmitri Akimov.

External links
 

1970 births
2006 deaths
Soviet footballers
FC Sibir Novosibirsk players
Russian footballers
FC Rostov players
Russian Premier League players
FC Asmaral Moscow players
FC Yugra Nizhnevartovsk players
Association football forwards
Sportspeople from Novosibirsk